The Central Superior Services (CSS; or Civil Service) is a permanent elite civil service  authority, and the civil service that is responsible for running the bureaucratic operations and government secretariats and directorates of the Cabinet of Pakistan. The Prime Minister is the final authority on all matters regarding the civil service.

The civil service defined itself as "key wheels on which the entire engine of the state has to move." Derived from the colonial legacy of the former British Civil Service, the civil service came into its modern formation immediately after the establishment of Pakistan as a "Civil Service of Pakistan". During its time of formation, the bureaucracy produced Ghulam Ishaq Khan who would go on to become the President of Pakistan. It had influence on many of the state's defence, internal, foreign and financial policies. In 1971, it was re-organized and reestablished under "Chapter I: Part-XII, Article 240" of the Constitution of Pakistan which gave it foundation and constitutional status. The civil bureaucracy closely collaborated with the military establishments of Pakistani Armed Forces in issues concerning the national security. The bureaucracy consists of 12 directorates that provide vital office and secretariat related duties to the Government of Pakistan. The provincial bureaucracies are headed by the respective Chief Secretaries of Khyber Pakhtunkhwa, Sindh, Punjab and Balochistan. The highest attainable rank for an officer who serves in the country's bureaucracy is BPS-22 grade.

The Civil Service of Pakistan selects only 7.5% of the applicants by merit, education, qualification and experience while the 92.5% are selected by a quota system. The civil service exams are competitive and provides equal opportunities to males and females, depending on their qualifications. The CSS Examinations are held at the start of every year. The exams are conducted and supervised by the Federal Public Service Commission. CSS exams have a reputation of a very low pass percentage. In 2020, the passing percentage was only 1.962. In 2021, only 364 (2.11%) of the 17,240 participants cleared the multi-staged exam.

Constitutional structure

The Constitution of Pakistan lays down separate services for the central government and the provincial governments. Although both types of governments are required to regulate their civil services through "Article 240 of Chapter I of Part XII", in case of the central reservation of the government and by the provisional assembly decrees for officers subjected in the legislative list of the provinces. The idea of civil service was established by the British Empire during the colonial period of the British Indian Empire.  It was derived into "Pakistan Civil Service" in 1947 and reorganized and re-established into its modern form in 1973. The Constitution of Pakistan describes the constitutional status as below:

Naming convention

The Constitution of Pakistan does not set the legal name for the civil service and there is no service named as "Central Superior Services of Pakistan" (or CSS). The constitution allowed the government-appointed officer and chairman of the Federal Public Service Commission of Pakistan to choose the name. The term "CSS" emerged during the first public examination of the civil service for the appointment on posts at officer entry-level in the occupational groups of All-Pakistan Unified Group (APUG). The Federal Public Service Commission holds the combined competitive exam annually under the title advertised as exam for "Central Superior Services"— the term of colonial days which survived reforms. Similarly, the use of the word "Central" instead of that "Federal"; as well as the term "Superior" is also the legacy of the past. These were relevant when there was central government under 1956 constitution and classes existed in the civil service. The 1973 constitution abolished all classes in the civil service as the concept of occupational groups was introduced.

Act
Following the foundations laid in the Constitution, the federal government promulgated The Civil Servants Act, 1973 and each province enacted its own Civil Servants Acts. The law allows civil service of the federation, and of provinces, to be regulated as per rules notified under these enactments. Consequently, both sets of governments have notified Civil Servants (Appointment, Transfer, and Promotion) Rules, 1974. The qualification and method (the way) of filling all posts are regulated by these rules. The posts at the initial officer level i.e. BS-17, are classified to be filled by way of promotion or transfer and by direct recruitment under share fixed for each category. The recommendation for appointment in BS-17, under direct recruitment share, is done by the Federal Public Service Commission, which is established under its own law as a requirement of the Constitution. The rest of the posts reserved for departmental officers under promotion quota and posts under appointment by transfer is confined for officers inducted through a lateral entry or for hardship cases coming from the surplus pool.
In practical terms, those appointed on posts in direct appointment quota in each occupational group through CSS Exam have a natural advantage. They join service at a young age as compared to departmental officers and therefore reach the highest slots. Since the number of direct officers at the entry-level are few but their quotas in posts in BS-18 to BS-22 are fixed on the higher side, therefore their promotions are fast-paced. These arrangements make the civil service attractive for talented individuals and instill a sense of superiority and pride.
Currently, CSS exams conducted by Federal Public Service Commission include the following Occupational Groups.

 Foreign Service of Pakistan
 Pakistan Administrative Service
 Police Service of Pakistan
 Inland Revenue Service of Pakistan
 Pakistan Customs Services
 Commerce & Trade Group
 Information Services of Pakistan
 Military Lands & Cantonment Group
 Office Management and Secretariat Group
 Pakistan Audit and Accounts Service
 Postal Group
 Railways (Commercial & Transport) Group

History of civil services in Pakistan

Civil Bureaucracy is a colonial legacy in this part of the world. The British used to rule the native population through Indian Civil Service (ICS) and most of the officers in ICS were British themselves. It was in the early 20th century that the Indians also started competing against the British and many Indians eventually made it to the ICS. With time the independence of Pakistan in 1947, the term 'Central Superior Services' was used in Pakistan and the concept of All-Pakistan Services continued. The latter consisted of the Civil Service of Pakistan and the Police Service of Pakistan, whereas the Central Services included the Pakistan Foreign Service and a broad category of Finance and other services. The Finance category included the Pakistan Audit and Accounts Service, Pakistan Railway Accounts Service, Pakistan Military Accounts Service, Pakistan Taxation Service, and the Pakistan Customs and Excise Service. The Central Services other than these included the Pakistan Postal Service, Pakistan Military Land and Cantonment Service, Central Secretariat Service, and Central Information Service. Each of these services had its own cadre and composition rules, specifying the total cadre strength in terms of its number of positions.

With the Civil Services Reforms of 1973, a new system of the common training program was introduced and all of these occupational groups (12 at that time) were required to go through a mandatory combined training at Civil Services Academy, Lahore. The batch of officers who attended the Civil Service Academy in 1973 is recognized as "1st Common". Up till 5th Common, the allocation of occupational groups was done after the culmination of the Common Training Program but from 6th Common onwards this task has also been assumed by Federal Public Service Commission. Even to this day, it is an official procedure that once the Probationary Officers successfully complete their common training program then they undergo some further Specialized Training Program (STP) in their own professional academies.

Pakistan Administrative Service
The Pakistan Administrative Service, previously known as the  District Management Group before 1 June 2012, is an elite cadre of the Civil Service of Pakistan. The Pakistan Administrative Service over the years has emerged as the most consolidated and developed civil institution, with the senior Pakistan Administrative Service officers of grade 22 often seen as stronger than the government ministers. The service of Pakistan Administrative Service is very versatile in nature and officers are assigned to different departments all across Pakistan during the course of their careers. Almost all of the country's high-profile bureaucratic positions such as the federal secretaries, the provincial chief secretaries and chairmen of top-heavy organizations like the National Highway Authority, Trading Corporation of Pakistan and State Life Insurance Corporation usually belong to the elite Pakistan Administrative Service.

Armed forces and civil services of Pakistan
Commissioned officers of Pakistan Army, Pakistan Air Force and Pakistan Navy have their own quota of 10% in all service groups of the Central Superior Services but historically they have only joined the Pakistan Administrative Service (previously known as the District Management Group), Office Management Group, Foreign Service of Pakistan, and Police Service of Pakistan. Usually officers who join the civil services are of the rank of Captain / Lieutenant / Flight Lieutenant (equivalent to BPS-17 grade). Rank are shortlisted by respective Services Headquarters and selected against this quota after interview process. The interviews are conducted by a committee headed by the Chairman of the Federal Public Service Commission, same as in the case for regular candidates. Only the written exam is waived.

Reform of civil services
Despite the fact that the Civil Services of Pakistan have been still running on the pattern set out by British Raj (no major change has been performed), the Musharraf government started a major reform process of it. The task was to be performed by the National Commission of Government Reforms (NCGR) under the chairmanship of Dr.Ishrat Hussain, the former governor of State Bank of Pakistan. The final report that was published in September 2007 stated that four CSS cadres i.e., Pakistan Railway Service, Pakistan Postal Service, Commerce, and Trade Group, and the Information Service of Pakistan, should be axed. According to the recommendation, Postal and Railway Service should be made autonomous commercial bodies, Commerce and Trade and Information Services be suspended till further notice. The report also highlighted broad changes in the examination system, with the recommendation of a personality test be made part of the selection process.

2016 onwards reforms
The civil services reforms have been under consideration and the Federal Minister for Planning, Development and Reforms Ahsan Iqbal has announced that the upper age limit would be increased up-to 30 years instead of 28, for taking the Central Superior Services (CSS) examination from 2017 onwards.; where as the increase educational qualification by 14 to 16 years. The CSS Aspirants collected funds from their pocket money and filed a petition in the Lahore High Court and Peshawar High court for the age relaxation.

On August 2, 2016, the Planning Commission announced plans to restructure the examination process by dividing the Civil Superior Services (CSS) under three cluster program comprising three categories including General, Finance, and Information by abolishing the existing generalized system. The plan would come into effect from 2018 and would require participants to possess a four-year bachelor's degree in a relevant discipline, for information cluster, a degree in mass communication, journalism or information science will be required, while for finance cluster a degree in economics, finance or related discipline will be required.

On January 1, 2016, the Planning Commission began phasing out the Annual Confidential Report (ACRs) with the key performance indicators (KPIs) to determine promotions of civil servants.

Recently in 2019 Prime Minister has constituted an Institutional Reforms cell (IRC) under Cabinet Division. This cell is working under the chairmanship of Ishrat Hussain. The cell is forcing Federal Departments to acquire autonomous status but the departments are resisting on multiple grounds.

CSS Examination and statistics
The CSS examination is extremely competitive; for every one aspirant selected there are 200 who are not; in 2015, more than 36000 candidates competed for 158 posts as compared to 2011 when approximately 19,000 candidates participated in the open public examination of the civil service; only 8.0% of them were qualified for 188 government jobs. In 2019, a total of 14,521 candidates appeared in the exam, out of which only 214 (1.47%) were finally recommended by the Federal Public Service Commission for various posts under the federal government. 

CSS exams are held every year in the entire country. These are conducted by the Federal Public Service Commission of Pakistan, which also posts successful candidates to various departments of the civil service.

Only the candidates between the 21 and 30 years old are eligible to apply for CSS Exam. A candidate can appear for a maximum of three attempts. CSS Exam has two major parts: a written test, which takes place in February or March, and a panel interview, which takes place in November.
In the first part FPSC test the students in 12 different subjects. Six subjects are compulsory and 6 are optional. Candidates can choose six subjects of their own choice from many different options. There is a total of 1200 numbers and a candidate must have to get 600 marks to pass the exam.

See also
 Civil Services Academy
 Police Service of Pakistan
 Pakistan Administrative Service
 Federal Secretary
 Establishment Secretary of Pakistan
 Chief Secretary Punjab
 Chief Secretary Sindh
 Chief Secretary Khyber Pakhtunkhwa
 Chief Secretary Balochistan
Deputy Commissioner

References

External links
Official website